The Karlgren–Li reconstruction of Middle Chinese was a representation of the sounds of Middle Chinese devised by Bernhard Karlgren and revised by Li Fang-Kuei in 1971, remedying a number of minor defects.

Sources for Middle Chinese

The Qieyun rime dictionary was created by Lu Fayan in 601 as a guide to proper pronunciation, particularly for the reading of classic texts. The dictionary divided characters between the four tones, which were subdivided into 193 rhyme groups and then into homophone groups. The pronunciation of each homophone group is given by a fanqie formula, a pair of common characters respectively indicating the initial and final sounds of the syllable. Lu Fayan's work was very influential, and led to a series of expanded and corrected versions following the same structure, the most important of which is the Guangyun (1007–08). The Qieyun was thought lost until the mid-20th century, and scholars worked from the Guangyun. Fortunately it was later found that the Guangyun had preserved the phonological system of the Qieyun with no significant change. The Qing dynasty scholar Chen Li analysed the fanqie spellings of the Guangyun, determining which initial and final spellers represented the same sounds, and thus enumerating the initials and finals of the underlying system. However this method gave no indication of how these were pronounced.

A series of rime tables from the Song dynasty incorporated a more sophisticated analysis, though the language had changed since the time of the Qieyun. The initials were identified and categorized by place and manner of articulation. Finals were classified into 16 rhyme classes ( shè). Within each rhyme class, syllables were classified as either "open" ( kāi) or "closed" ( hé), as belonging to one of the four tones, and as belonging to one of four divisions ( děng), indicated by rows of the table. The Qing philologists found that some of the finals of the rime dictionaries were always placed in the first row, some always in the second and some always in the fourth, and they were thus named finals of divisions I, II and IV respectively. The remaining finals were spread across the second, third and fourth rows, and were later called division III finals.

Karlgren's reconstruction 

Karlgren believed that the Qieyun system (represented by the Guangyun) reflected the standard speech of the Sui-Tang capital Chang'an (modern Xi'an), which spread across the empire except for Fujian. He attempted to determine the sounds of this "Ancient Chinese" (now called Middle Chinese) by applying the comparative method to data that he had collected on modern dialects, as well as the pronunciations of Chinese loanwords in other languages. Since the discovery of an early copy of the Qieyun in 1947, most scholars believe the dictionary reflects a combination of reading pronunciation standards from the capitals of the late Northern and Southern dynasties period.

Karlgren's transcription involved a large number of consonants and vowels, many of them very unevenly distributed; indeed he disdained phonemic analysis as a "craze". In a few cases he was unable to distinguish the pronunciations of ancient finals, and thus gave them identical transcriptions. His notation, based on Johan August Lundell's Swedish Dialect Alphabet, went through several revisions from his  (1915–1926) through to the Compendium of Phonetics in Ancient and Archaic Chinese (1954). The same notation was used in his Grammata Serica Recensa (1957), a dictionary of Middle and Old Chinese that remains a standard reference, even though Karlgren's reconstruction of Old Chinese has been superseded by those of Li Fang-Kuei and William Baxter, among others.

In the early 1970s, Li Fang-Kuei used an amended version of Karlgren's transcription as a point of departure for his reconstruction of Old Chinese phonology. Li addressed some of the criticisms of Karlgren's system, revising some initials and distinguishing finals that Karlgren had combined. Although Karlgren's view of Middle Chinese as a single spoken variety is no longer widely held, his transcription, as revised by Li, is still widely used as a notation for the Qieyun categories.

Initials 

Li replaced Karlgren's reversed apostrophe as an indicator of aspiration with a letter h for convenience. While Karlgren had originally reconstructed the voiced stop initials as aspirated, Li treated them as unaspirated. Li also recast Karlgren's alveolar dentals as retroflex, citing a similar distribution to the retroflex affricates.
{| class="wikitable" style="margin: 1em auto 1em auto;"
|-
! colspan="6" | Initials with traditional names !! Notes
|-
|  p- ||  ph- ||  b- ||  m- || || ||
|-
|  t- ||  th- ||  d- ||  n- || ||  l- || divisions I and IV only
|-
|  ṭ- ||  ṭh- ||  ḍ- ||  ṇ- || || || retroflex, division II only
|-
|  ts- ||  tsh- ||  dz- || ||  s- ||  z- || divisions I, III and IV
|-
|  tṣ- ||  tṣh- ||  dẓ- || ||  ṣ- || || retroflex, division II only
|-
|  tś- ||  tśh- ||  dź- ||  ńź- ||  ś- ||  ź- || alveolo-palatals, division III only
|-
|  k- ||  kh- ||  g- ||  ng- ||  x- ||  ɣ- ||
|-
|  ·- ||  j- ||  ji- || || || || the centred dot represents a glottal stop
|}
Most scholars now believe that the dź- and ź- initials were interchanged in the rime tables, by which time they had merged.

Vowels 

Karlgren used a selection of vowel symbols from the Swedish Dialect Alphabet, here shown with IPA equivalents where different:
{| class="wikitable" style="margin: 1em auto 1em auto;"
|-
! rowspan="2" |
! colspan="3" | Unrounded
! Rounded
|-
! Front
! Central
! Back
! Back
|-
! high
| i || || || u
|-
! upper mid
| e || || || o
|-
! mid
| || ə || ||
|-
! lower mid
| ä (ɛ) || || || å (ɔ)
|-
! near-low
| ɛ (æ) || ɒ (ɐ) || ||
|-
! low
| a || || â (ɑ) ||
|}
In addition, ậ denotes a shorter (or centralized) variant of â, while ă, ĕ and ə̆ denote shorter variants of a, e and ə, respectively.

Finals 

Karlgren divided the division III finals into two groups:

 type α (mixed) finals could occur in rows 2, 3 and 4 of the rime tables, and with all kinds of initials.
 type β (pure) finals could only occur in row 3 of the rime tables, and only with labial, velar or laryngeal initials. These finals also conditioned labiodentalization in Late Middle Chinese.

Li made a number of changes to remedy limitations of Karlgren's system:

 He replaced Karlgren's -i̯- with the more convenient and conventional -j-.
 Where Karlgren had combined a pair of finals as -i, Li distinguished them as -i and -ï.
 Similarly a pair of finals initially treated as -ai became -ai and -aï.
 Karlgren had also not been able to distinguish the so-called chóngniǔ doublets of division III finals, and treated them as type α division III finals. Li introduced the spelling -ji- for finals occurring in the fourth row of the rime tables, retaining -j- for those occurring in the third row.

These were intended as purely notational devices, rather than suggested pronunciations.

Karlgren's spellings for open finals, which could occur in the level, rising or departing tones, are given below, with the names of their Guangyun rhyme groups, and grouped by the broad rhyme classes ( shè) of the rime tables. Where unrounded (kāi) and rounded (hé) finals occurred in the same Guangyun rhyme group, Karlgren marked the latter with a -w- medial. Where they were split between two Guangyun rhyme groups, he marked the rounded final with a -u- medial.

{| class="wikitable" style="margin: 1em auto 1em auto;"
|+ Vocalic codas
|-
! rowspan="2" | Rhymeclass
! colspan="5" | Division
|-
! I !! II !! IIIα !! IIIβ !! IV
|-
!  guǒ
|  -(u)â || ||  -j(u)â || ||
|-
!  jiǎ
| ||  -(w)a ||  -ja || ||
|- valign="top"
! rowspan="2" |  yù
|  -uo || ||  -jwo || ||
|-
| || ||  -ju || ||
|- valign="top"
! rowspan="3" |  xiè
|  -(u)ậi ||  -(w)ăi || colspan="2" |  -j(w)(i)äi ||  -i(w)ei
|-
|  -(w)âi ||  -(w)ai || ||  -j(w)ɐi ||
|-
| ||  -(w)aï || || ||
|- valign="top"
! rowspan="3" |  zhǐ
| || || colspan="2" |  -j(w)(i)ĕ ||
|-
| || || colspan="2" |  -(j)(w)i ||
|-
| || ||  -ï ||  -j(w)ĕi ||
|-
!  xiào
|  -âu ||  -au || colspan="2" |  -j(i)äu ||  -ieu
|- valign="top"
! rowspan="2" |  liú
|  -ə̆u || ||  -jə̆u || ||
|-
| || ||  -jiə̆u || ||
|}

Finals ending in nasals -m, -n and -ng could occur in the level, rising or departing tones, with parallel finals ending in -p, -t and -k placed in the entering tone.

{| class="wikitable" style="margin: 1em auto 1em auto;"
|+ Nasal codas
|-
! rowspan="2" | Rhymeclass
! colspan="5" | Division
|-
! I !! II !! IIIα !! IIIβ !! IV
|- valign="top"
! rowspan="2" |  xián
|  -âm ||  -am || colspan="2" |  -j(i)äm ||  -iem
|-
|  -ậm ||  -ăm || ||  -j(w)ɐm ||
|-
!  shēn 
| || || colspan="2" |  -j(i)əm ||
|- valign="top"
! rowspan="2" |  shān
|  -(u)ân ||  -(w)an || ||  -j(w)ɐn ||
|-
| ||  -(w)ăn || colspan="2" |  -j(w)(i)än ||  -i(w)en
|- valign="top"
! rowspan="2" |  zhēn
|  -(u)ən || ||  -jɛn ||  -j(u)ən ||
|-
| || || colspan="2" |  -j(u)(i)ĕn ||
|- valign="top"
!  dàng
|  -(w)âng || ||  -j(w)ang || ||
|- valign="top"
! rowspan="2" |  gěng
| ||  -(w)ɐng || ||  -j(w)ɐng ||
|-
| ||  -(w)ɛng ||  -j(w)äng || ||  -i(w)eng
|-
!  zēng
|  -(w)əng || ||  -jəng || ||
|- valign="top"
! rowspan="2" |  tōng
|  -ung || ||  -jung || ||
|-
|  -uong || ||  -jwong || ||
|-
!  jiāng
| ||  -ång || || ||
|}
Notes:

Tones 
The rising tone was marked with a trailing colon, the departing tone with a trailing hyphen. The level and entering tones were unmarked.

Coblin's revision 
W. South Coblin made further simplifications, without sacrificing any contrasts:

 the initial ·- is written ʔ-
 the vowels ậ and ə̆ are written ə
 the vowel ĕ is written e
 the medial -u- is written -w-

See also
 Baxter's transcription for Middle Chinese

References

Further reading 
 
 
 
 

Middle Chinese